Tritiyo Matra is a talk-show program aired on Channel I. On July 7, 2003 the program first aired on TV. Known as the first talk show in Bangladesh. At present, the Tritiyo Matra is broadcast on channel I in Bangladesh at 1:00 am and at 9:45 am. The program's planner, director and presenter Zillur Rahman.

Description 
Tritiyo Matra discusses the important issues of politics. In each episode there are two guests, who argue for themselves. While the third dimension is primarily a politics-based discussion, it discusses every issue, including society, economics, science, literature, and humanities. On various important days in Bangladesh, the program also discussed outside politics. As of November 7, the show has aired a total of 8 episodes।

Award 
 2003 - Bangladesh Television Reporters Association Award, best talk-show
 2003, 2004, 2005 - Bangladesh Film Journalist Association Award, Television Department, Best Talk Show (Educational) 
 2004 - Dhaka Cultural Reporters Association Star Award, Best Talk Show
 2004 - Stamford-Bangladesh Television Reporters Association Award
 2009 - Bangladesh Cultural Reporters Association

Besides, the Tritiyo Matra as the best television program was nominated for the 2003 Meril Prothom Aloa Award  in 2003 and 2004.

References

External links 
 Tritiyo Matra Official Site

Bangladeshi television talk shows
Channel i original programming